Kapllani is an Albanian surname. Notable people with the surname include:

Dejvid Kapllani (born 2001), Albanian footballer 
Edmond Kapllani (born 1982), Albanian footballer
Gazmend Kapllani (born 1967), Albanian-born writer and journalist
Xhevair Kapllani (born 1974), Albanian footballer

Albanian-language surnames